RMS Quetta was a Royal Mail Ship that was wrecked on the Far North Queensland coast of Australia on 28 February 1890. Quettas sinking killed 134 of the 292 people on board, making it one of Queensland's biggest maritime catastrophes. It was caused by collision with an uncharted rock in the Adolphus Channel.

Background
RMS Quetta was a British-India Steam Navigation Company liner that travelled between England, India and the Far East. The Queensland Government negotiated to have a service between the United Kingdom and Brisbane, to ease the passage of people and mail. Quetta was specifically built for the Australia run, with refrigeration capacity for the frozen meat trade. The ship was launched in March 1881 and made her first voyage to Brisbane in 1883. The designation RMS indicated the ship's role within the Queensland Royal Mail Line. Her sister ships were Manora and Merkara.

The ship was initially designed for 72 saloon (first class) and 32 steerage (second class) passengers, although this was later altered to favour steerage class due to the large number of migrants using the service. In five-and-a-half years service Quetta made 11 London-Brisbane round trips; the twelfth would be her final attempt.

Disaster

On the night of 28 February 1890 the ship's master was Captain Sanders, with Captain Keatinge aboard piloting the ship through the Torres Strait. Destined for Thursday Island, the ship turned into the Adolphus Channel to round the Cape York Peninsula. The pilot was experienced, the weather fine and visibility good, but at 9:14pm the ship struck an uncharted rock in the middle of the channel near Albany Island.

The rock ripped a hole through the plates from the bow to the engine room amidships, four to 12 feet wide, sinking Quetta in 5 minutes and sending 134 of her passengers to their deaths. At the time, Quettas loss was thought to be the worst maritime disaster of Queensland.

At the time of the disaster Quetta had 292 people aboard: a crew of 121, comprising 15 European officers, 14 from other trades and 92 lascars from India; 70 Javanese in temporary deck houses, travelling to Batavia after working in the cane fields; and 101 other passengers.

The ship's cutter floated clear of the wreck and capsized, surrounded by a large group of Javanese and lascar seamen. Quartermaster James Oates organised the baling of the cutter and it headed towards shore. Only one of the ship's lifeboats survived: Number 1 starboard lifeboat controlled by third officer Thomas Babb. It was damaged and largely awash. As it headed toward shore it picked up more survivors including Captain Sanders. Around midnight the two boats came together and those aboard were placed on the nearest island. Captain Sanders then ordered the cutter to search for more survivors.

After spending a night and day without food and water on Little Adolphus Island the main group of ninety-eight survivors were rescued by Albatross, that along with Merrie England had been dispatched from Thursday Island's Port Kennedy.

Relics raised during salvage attempts months after the disaster, and later, can be found in the Quetta Memorial Church on Thursday Island, which was consecrated in 1893.

Memorials

As a memorial to the lives lost on the Quetta, the Quetta Memorial Precinct was established on Thursday Island, comprising a church (later a cathedral), a rectory and a church hall.

Notable passengers 
 Claudius Buchanan Whish, and wife, Anne Ker Whish (both died)
 John Watson of Watson, Ferguson and Company, and wife, Elizabeth Selim Watson (both died)
 George (70) and Jessie Blanche Prentice (18), paternal grandfather and half-sister of George Gray Prentice (both died)
Alexander Archer, manager of the Bank of New South Wales in Brisbane, brother of Archibald Archer, and wife, Mary Louisa, a daughter of Sir Robert Mackenzie, 10th Baronet (both died)
 Reuben Nicklin, and wife, Jane Lahey Nicklin, paternal grandparents of future Premier of Queensland Frank Nicklin both died. Jane Lahey Nicklin was the daughter of the prosperous timber merchant Francis Lahey and her brothers formed Lahey's Canungra Sawmill.  The Nicklin family home "Hatherton" became the Queen Alexandra Home. Their 19-year-old daughter Alice Elizabeth Nicklin was one of the few female survivors.  She was a strong swimmer and clung onto floating objects including a grating, then a dead sheep, then a plank.  She  was in the water on the dark, moonless night,  sleeping and paddling on the plank and eventually made it to shore about three hours into the next day.

References

 Underwater picture propeller and rudder

Further reading

 Foley, John C. H. (1990). The Quetta: Queensland's worst disaster. Aspley, QLD: Nairana Publications. .
Quetta survivor, Miss Alice Nicklin, includes a picture of Miss Nicklin, Town and Country Journal 15 March 1890.  https://trove.nla.gov.au/newspaper/article/71109040?searchTerm=%22alice%20nicklin%22
The wreck of the Quetta, South Australian Register 5 March 1890, https://trove.nla.gov.au/newspaper/article/47074895/4056048
The tragic tale of the Quetta, includes a picture of the Quetta, Torres News 30 July 2012, https://trove.nla.gov.au/newspaper/article/255045061?searchTerm=quetta%20sinking

External links

 
 RMS Quetta: 126th anniversary album on Flickr, by State Library of Queensland

1881 ships
Maritime incidents in 1890
Shipwrecks of Queensland
Victorian-era merchant ships of the United Kingdom